Campiglossa martii is a species of tephritid or fruit flies in the genus Campiglossa of the family Tephritidae.

Distribution
The species is found in the Canary Islands.

References

Tephritinae
Insects described in 1908
Taxa named by Theodor Becker
Diptera of Europe